The 2019–20 season was Detroit City FC's first professional season since the club was established in 2012 and their first in the National Independent Soccer Association.

Overview
Detroit City FC was accepted in the National Independent Soccer Association on December 11, 2019, and began competing in the 2020 Spring season. After playing a single match, the NISA season was postponed and then ultimately canceled on April 27, 2020 due to the COVID-19 pandemic.

Club

Roster 
As of March 25, 2020.

Coaching staff

Transfers

Transfers In

Transfers Out

Friendlies

Competitions

NISA Fall season
Detroit City did not take part in the 2019 NISA Fall season in an official capacity. On August 15, the NISA Board of Governors announced Detroit, along with Chattanooga FC and Oakland Roots SC, had been accepted into the league but would not begin full league play until Spring 2020. The team did play a friendly match against then NISA member Philadelphia Fury on Saturday, August 31 at home. City also hosted a friendly against Liga MX side Atlas F.C. in September and earned the upset win, 2–1, in-front of a sold-out crowd.

NISA Spring season
Details for the 2020 NISA Spring showcase were announced 27 January 2020. On 4 February 2020 Detroit City FC announced a TV deal with local WMYD TV20 Detroit and the spring season home kickoff times.

Standings

Results summary

Matches

U.S. Open Cup 

Detroit will enter the 2020 U.S. Open Cup with the rest of the National Independent Soccer Association teams in the Second Round. It was announced on 29 January that their first opponent would be USL Championship side El Paso Locomotive FC.

Squad statistics

Appearances and goals 

|-
! colspan="16" style="background:#dcdcdc; text-align:center"| Goalkeepers

|-
! colspan="16" style="background:#dcdcdc; text-align:center"| Defenders

|-
! colspan="16" style="background:#dcdcdc; text-align:center"| Midfielders

|-
! colspan="16" style="background:#dcdcdc; text-align:center"| Forwards

|-
|}

Goal scorers

Disciplinary record

See also
 2019–20 NISA season

Notes
1. Only includes matches played during the 2020 spring leg of the 2019–20 NISA season.
2. Only includes competitive matches played after 1st January, 2020.

References

American soccer clubs 2019 season
American soccer clubs 2020 season
2019 in sports in Michigan
2020 in sports in Michigan